Anolis baracoae, the Baracoa giant anole or Baracoa anole, is a species of lizard in the family Dactyloidae. The species is found in Cuba.

References

Anoles
Reptiles described in 1964
Reptiles of Cuba
Endemic fauna of Cuba
Taxa named by Albert Schwartz (zoologist)